Decent Work for Decent Pay is a DJ mix compilation album by Diplo. It was released on Big Dada on January 26, 2009.

Critical reception
At Metacritic, which assigns a weighted average score out of 100 to reviews from mainstream critics, Decent Work for Decent Pay received an average score of 60% based on 10 reviews, indicating "mixed or average reviews".

C. T. Heaney of PopMatters gave the album 5 stars out of 10, saying, "it goes in so many different directions (some expertly, some unimpressively) that it's hard to tell what, exactly, Diplo is trying to accomplish by putting it all here in one place."

Track listing

Charts

References

External links
 

2009 compilation albums
Diplo albums
Big Dada albums
Albums produced by Diplo